Copiapó River is a river of Chile located in the Atacama Region. Starting at the confluence of the Jorquera and Pulido rivers, the Copiapó flows for only 2.5 km before receiving the waters of the Manflas River. It flows through the city of Copiapó.

See also
 List of rivers of Chile

References

Rivers of Atacama Region
Rivers of Chile